The 2018 South Dakota attorney general election was held on November 6, 2018. Incumbent attorney general Marty Jackley was term-limited and ran for Governor of South Dakota. In June 2018, the South Dakota Republican party nominated Jason Ravnsborg for attorney general and the Democratic party nominated Randy Seiler. Ravnsborg won the election to become the 31st attorney general of South Dakota.

Background
In 2009, Republican incumbent Marty Jackley was first appointed attorney general by then-governor Mike Rounds. Jackley succeeded one-term Republican incumbent Larry Long, who opted to be appointed by Governor Mike Rounds to be a circuit court judge in Sioux Falls. Jackley was then elected in 2010 and re-elected in 2014.

Democratic nomination

Former U.S. Attorney for the District of South Dakota, Randy Seiler won the nomination at the Democratic Convention

On June 15, 2018, Seiler defeated former Oglala Lakota Attorney General Tatewin Means at the Democratic Convention held in Sioux Falls, South Dakota by an approximate 2-to-1 margin. Means made history by becoming the first indigenous woman to run for attorney general.

Republican nomination

Yankton Attorney, Jason Ravnsborg won the South Dakota Republican nomination at its state convention. 

On June 23, 2018, In the second round of voting, Ravnsborg defeated South Dakota State Senator Lance Russell of Hot Springs, South Dakota for the Republican nomination by a margin of 63% to 37% at the Republican Convention in Pierre, South Dakota.

In the first Round of voting at the Convention Ravnsborg lead with 47% of the vote; Russell had 27% and Lawrence County States Attorney John Fitzgerald had 26%.  Therefore, Fitzgerald was eliminated after the first round of voting and Ravnsborg and Russell would go head to head.

Chief Deputy Attorney General Charlie McGuigan withdrew from the race prior to the convention.

No third-party candidates

While both the Libertarian and the Constitution party had party status, neither nominated anyone for this race. Furthermore, no Independents ran in this race.

General election

Both Seiler and Ravnsborg were alumni of the University of South Dakota School of Law ensuring that the school's graduate would continue to hold the office, a streak that has continued since 1959. 

Ravnsborg secured a number of endorsements during the election.  He was endorsed by forty county sheriffs; the Fraternal Order of Police; thirty states attorneys; the National Rifle Association; South Dakota Right to Life; and the Family Heritage Alliance.

Ravnsborg went on to win the November general election.

Results

See also
 South Dakota elections, 2018

References

External links
 Elections & Voting – South Dakota Secretary of State

Official South Dakota Attorney General candidate websites
Randy Seiler (D) for Attorney General
Jason Ravnsborg (R) for Attorney General

attorney
South Dakota
South Dakota Attorney General elections